Group 1 of the UEFA Euro 1968 qualifying tournament was one of the eight groups to decide which teams would qualify for the UEFA Euro 1968 finals tournament. Group 1 consisted of four teams: Spain, Czechoslovakia, Republic of Ireland, and Turkey, where they played against each other home-and-away in a round-robin format. The group winners were Spain, who finished 1 point above Czechoslovakia.

Final table

Matches

 (*)NOTE: Attendance also reported as 6,257 

 (*)NOTE: Attendance also reported as 25,314 

 (*)NOTE: Attendance also reported as 35,000 

 (*)NOTE: Attendance also reported as 7,615

Goalscorers

References
 
 
 

Group 1
1966–67 in Spanish football
1967–68 in Spanish football
1966–67 in Czechoslovak football
1967–68 in Czechoslovak football
1966–67 in Republic of Ireland association football
1967–68 in Republic of Ireland association football
1966–67 in Turkish football
1967–68 in Turkish football